Nancy Dowd (born 1945) is an Academy Award-winning screenwriter most famous for her films Slap Shot and Coming Home.

Career

Dowd is a graduate of the UCLA Film School.

Her brother Ned Dowd inspired the story behind Slap Shot based on his experiences playing minor league hockey. Ned and his wife, Nancy N. Dowd, both appeared in the film.

She wrote lyrics for a song used in Ladies and Gentlemen, The Fabulous Stains, another film she wrote.

Dowd often uses pseudonyms such as Rob Morton or Ernest Morton, or simply writes films without being officially credited.

Filmography
F.T.A. (1972) (Documentary)
Slap Shot (1977)
Coming Home (with Waldo Salt and Robert C. Jones) (1978) 
Straight Time (1978) (uncredited)
North Dallas Forty (1979) (uncredited)
Saturday Night Live (1980-1981) (TV)
Ordinary People (1980) (uncredited)
Ladies and Gentlemen, The Fabulous Stains (1982) (as "Rob Morton")
Love (1982) (segment "For Life")
Cloak & Dagger (1984) (uncredited)
Swing Shift (1984) (as "Rob Morton")
White Nights (1985) (uncredited)
Let It Ride (1989) (as "Ernest Morton")

References

External links

1945 births
Living people
Screenwriters from Massachusetts
Best Original Screenplay Academy Award winners
People from Framingham, Massachusetts
American women screenwriters
21st-century American women
UCLA Film School alumni